James Richmond may refer to:

James Buchanan Richmond (1842–1910), U.S. Representative from Virginia
James Theodore Richmond (1890–1975), American writer, conservationist, preacher and librarian
James Crowe Richmond (1822–1898), New Zealand politician, engineer and watercolourist
James Richmond (footballer, born 1858) (1858–1898), Scottish international footballer
James Richmond (Paralympic footballer) (born 1980), British football player in the 2012 Paralympic Games
James Richmond (Medal of Honor) (1843–1864), Union Army soldier and Medal of Honor recipient